This is a confirmed list of video games in development, but are scheduled for release beyond 2023 or currently carry no release date at all.



2024

2025

Video game-based film releases

In development

Unknown status

The following list includes games that were announced but have not seen progress updates in years, also known as being in development hell, or have been put on indefinite hold. They may be also deemed as vaporware due to the above reasons.

Notes

References